Post Office Building, Upper Montclair, also known as the Gumersall Building, is located in Montclair, Essex County, New Jersey, United States. Designed by the architect Francis A. Nelson, the building was built in 1918 and was added to the National Register of Historic Places on July 1, 1988.

See also
National Register of Historic Places listings in Essex County, New Jersey

References

Montclair, New Jersey
Government buildings completed in 1918
Buildings and structures in Essex County, New Jersey
Upper Montclair
National Register of Historic Places in Essex County, New Jersey
New Jersey Register of Historic Places